Bruce Patterson (born 1947) was a Republican member of the Michigan Senate, representing the 7th district from 2003 to 2011. His district covers parts of Wayne County.

Patterson defeated Democrat Mark Slavens in 2002 and 2006. He previously served two terms in the Michigan House of Representatives, from 1999 to 2002. He was the first freshman representative to serve as the Associate Speaker Pro Tempore. In his second term, he was elected the Majority Floor Leader.

Before being elected to the state legislature, Patterson served two terms as a Wayne County Commissioner, from 1995 to 1998. He was also an administrator at Eastern Michigan University and had twenty years experience in private law practice. He received a B.A. from Wayne State University in 1969 and a J.D. in 1972 from the Law School at Wayne State University.

In late 2009 he announced his bid for Attorney General for the state of Michigan. He did not pursue this bid through to the nomination process at the state Republican convention in Lansing.

References
 About Senator Bruce Patterson from the Michigan Senate, accessed August 19, 2007
 State Senator Bruce Patterson, p. 146, Michigan Manual 2005–2006, accessed August 19, 2007
Bruce Patterson is no longer a member of the Michigan State Senate.

External links
 Michigan Senate Republicans - Bruce Patterson official party site
 Project Vote Smart - Senator Bruce Patterson (MI) profile
 Follow the Money - Bruce Patterson
 2006 2004 2002 2000 1998 campaign contributions
 Michigan Bureau of Elections - Bruce Patterson campaign finance reports and data

1947 births
County commissioners in Michigan
Living people
Michigan state senators
Members of the Michigan House of Representatives
Wayne State University alumni
Michigan lawyers
Eastern Michigan University people